Walwan Dam, (or Valvan Dam) is a gravity dam on the Indrayani river near Lonavla, Pune district in State of Maharashtra in India. It provides water to the nearby Khopoli Power Plant and to residents of Lonavla and Khandala and neighborhood villages.

Specifications

Purpose
 Hydroelectricity

See also
 Dams in Maharashtra
 List of reservoirs and dams in India

References

Dams in Pune district
Dams completed in 1916
1916 establishments in India
20th-century architecture in India